The Mind & Brain Prize was established in 2003 and aims at honouring the most relevant researchers in the field of cognitive science, as well as to recognize outstanding achievement in advancing knowledge about mind and brain by persons whose work contributed to the growth and development of the discipline. It is awarded by the University and Polytechnic of Turin.

Laureates 

2003 – Giacomo Rizzolatti, Domenico Parisi
2004 – Philip Johnson-Laird, Carlo Umiltà, Mariateresa Molo
2005 – Jerry A. Fodor, James L. McClelland
2006 – John R. Searle, Andrea Comba
2007 – Michael Tomasello, Cristiano Castelfranchi, Il Sole 24 Ore
2008 – Jon Kabat-Zinn, Giorgio Rezzonigo, Fondazione Cavalieri Ottolenghi
2009 – Dan Sperber, Jacques Mehler, 
2010 – Uta Frith
2011 – Daniel Dennett
2013 – Tim Shallice
2014 – Stanislas Dehaene
2015 – Nicholas Humphrey
2016 – Antonio Damasio

See also 
 The Brain Prize also known as the Grete Lundbeck European Brain Research Prize
 The Kavli Prize
 Golden Brain Award
 Gruber Prize in Neuroscience
 List of psychology awards
 W. Alden Spencer Award
 Ralph W. Gerard Prize in Neuroscience

References

Awards established in 2003
Cognitive science awards